The Apprentice is a 1991 animated short by Richard Condie, produced in Winnipeg by Ches Yetman for the National Film Board of Canada.

A more enigmatic work than Condie's popular short The Big Snit, the film is a series of animated blackout sketches, telling the story of a medieval jester and his young apprentice. The "dialogue" is supplied by gargling noises, sampled on a computer.

The film received a Blizzard Award for Best Animation at the 1993 Manitoba Motion Picture Industry Association Film & Video Awards.

References

External links
Watch The Apprentice/L'Apprenti at NFB.ca

1991 short films
Films directed by Richard Condie
National Film Board of Canada animated short films
Animated films without speech
Fictional jesters
1990s animated short films
1991 animated films
1991 films
Canadian animated short films
Quebec films
1990s Canadian films